Metrioglypha viridicosta is a moth of the family Tortricidae. It is found in Vietnam.

The wingspan is 21 mm. The costal part of the forewings is yellowish cream extending to the middle dorsally and terminating at the apex. The costal strigulae (fine streaks) are white. The dorsal part of the wing is whitish suffused with greenish. The hindwings are greyish brown but paler basally.

References

Moths described in 2009
Olethreutini
Moths of Asia
Taxa named by Józef Razowski